The 2019–20 UEFA Champions League was the 65th season of Europe's premier club football tournament organised by UEFA, and the 28th season since it was renamed from the European Champion Clubs' Cup to the UEFA Champions League.

Bayern Munich defeated Paris Saint-Germain in the final, played at the Estádio da Luz in Lisbon, Portugal, 1–0 and became the first European Cup winners to win all their matches during the tournament. In addition, the Germans secured their second continental treble, becoming only the second European club to do so, and became the first team to claim any European competition with a 100% winning record. As winners, they earned the right to play against Sevilla, the winners of the 2019–20 UEFA Europa League, in the 2020 UEFA Super Cup, and also qualified for the 2020 FIFA Club World Cup in Qatar.  They would go on to win both competitions. Since they had already qualified for the 2020–21 UEFA Champions League group stage through their league performance, the berth originally reserved for the Champions League title holders was given to the team that was top of the 2019–20 Eredivisie (Ajax), the 11th-ranked association according to next season's access list, when it was suspended due to the COVID-19 pandemic.

Due to the impact of the COVID-19 pandemic, the tournament was suspended in mid-March 2020 and resumed in August. The quarter-finals onwards were played as single-match knockout ties at neutral venues in Lisbon, Portugal (Estádio da Luz and Estádio José Alvalade) behind closed doors from 12 to 23 August. In keeping with its introduction the campaign prior, the video assistant referee (VAR) system was in use from the play-off round onwards.

Liverpool were the defending champions, but they – along with the previous season's other finalists, Tottenham Hotspur – were eliminated in the round of 16, following defeats to Atlético Madrid and RB Leipzig respectively.

Association team allocation
A total of 79 teams from 54 of the 55 UEFA member associations participated in the 2019–20 UEFA Champions League (the exception being Liechtenstein, which did not organise a domestic league). The association ranking based on the UEFA country coefficients was used to determine the number of participating teams for each association:
Associations 1–4 each had four teams qualify.
Associations 5–6 each had three teams qualify.
Associations 7–15 each had two teams qualify.
Associations 16–55 (except Liechtenstein) each had one team qualify.
The winners of the 2018–19 UEFA Champions League and 2018–19 UEFA Europa League were each given an additional entry if they did not qualify for the 2019–20 UEFA Champions League through their domestic leagues. However, both qualified through their domestic leagues, meaning the additional entries were not necessary.

Association ranking
For the 2019–20 UEFA Champions League, the associations were allocated places according to their 2018 UEFA country coefficients, which took into account their performance in European competitions from 2013–14 to 2017–18.

Apart from the allocation based on the country coefficients, associations could have additional teams participating in the Champions League, as noted below:
 – Additional berth for UEFA Champions League title holders
 – Additional berth for UEFA Europa League title holders

Distribution
The following is the access list for this season.

Changes were made to the default access list, if the Champions League and/or Europa League title holders qualified for the tournament via their domestic leagues. In any case where a spot in the Champions League was vacated, teams of the highest-ranked associations in earlier rounds of the appropriate path were promoted accordingly.
In the default access list, the Champions League title holders qualified for the group stage. However, since the Champions League title holders (Liverpool) qualified via their domestic league (as second place in the 2018–19 Premier League), the following changes to the access list were made:
The champions of association 11 (Austria) entered the group stage instead of the play-off round.
The champions of association 13 (Czech Republic) entered the play-off round instead of the third qualifying round.
The champions of association 15 (Greece) entered the third qualifying round instead of the second qualifying round.
The champions of associations 18 (Israel) and 19 (Cyprus) entered the second qualifying round instead of the first qualifying round.
In the default access list, the Europa League title holders qualified for the group stage. However, since the Europa League title holders (Chelsea) qualified for the group stage via their domestic league (as third place in the 2018–19 Premier League), the following changes to the access list were made:
The third-placed team of association 5 (France) entered the group stage instead of the third qualifying round.
The runners-up of associations 10 (Turkey) and 11 (Austria) entered the third qualifying round instead of the second qualifying round.

Teams
League positions of the previous season shown in parentheses (TH: Champions League title holders; EL: Europa League title holders).

Round and draw dates
The schedule of the competition was as follows (all draws were held at the UEFA headquarters in Nyon, Switzerland, unless stated otherwise).

The competition was suspended on 17 March 2020 due to the COVID-19 pandemic in Europe. A working group was set up by UEFA to decide the calendar of the remainder of the season. On 17 June 2020, UEFA announced the revised schedule for the quarter-finals, semi-finals and final of the competition, to be played in single-leg matches.

The original schedule of the competition, as planned before the pandemic, was as follows.

Effects of the COVID-19 pandemic
The round of 16 ties were to be played across four weeks, with the first legs being played across two weeks in February and the second legs across two weeks in March. Because of this, the first leg ties were unaffected by the pandemic, but the second leg ties were affected in different ways. All of the four matches in the first week of fixtures went ahead but due to the increased severity of the COVID-19 pandemic in Spain and France, Valencia's and PSG's home games were played behind closed doors. On 15 March, UEFA announced a halt to the competition meaning that the remaining second leg games would be postponed indefinitely. A taskforce was convened to reschedule the rest of the season. On 23 March, it was announced that the Atatürk Olympic Stadium in Istanbul, Turkey would no longer host the competition final, originally scheduled for 30 May, but would host the 2021 final instead. This was later postponed further to 2023.

On 17 June, it was announced that the Champions League would return on 7 August and conclude on 23 August, with the rest of the tournament to be held in Portugal, with the exception of the four unplayed round of 16 second legs, which would be played at their original venues. The last 8 of the competition would be played as a mini-tournament style with remaining fixtures to be played as single legged ties. All remaining ties of the competition were played behind closed doors due to the remaining presence of the COVID-19 pandemic in Europe.

Final tournament venues

Qualifying rounds

In the qualifying rounds and the play-off round, teams were divided into seeded and unseeded teams based on their 2019 UEFA club coefficients, and then drawn into two-legged home-and-away ties.

Preliminary round
In the preliminary round, teams were divided into seeded and unseeded teams based on their 2019 UEFA club coefficients, and then drawn into one-legged semi-final and final ties. The losers of both semi-final and final rounds entered the 2019–20 UEFA Europa League second qualifying round.

First qualifying round
The losers entered the 2019–20 UEFA Europa League second qualifying round, except one team who was drawn to receive a bye to the 2019–20 UEFA Europa League third qualifying round.

Second qualifying round
The second qualifying round was split into two separate sections: Champions Path (for league champions) and League Path (for league non-champions). The losers from both Champions Path and League Path entered the 2019–20 UEFA Europa League third qualifying round.

Third qualifying round
The third qualifying round was split into two separate sections: Champions Path (for league champions) and League Path (for league non-champions). The losers from the Champions Path entered the 2019–20 UEFA Europa League play-off round, while the losers from the League Path entered the 2019–20 UEFA Europa League group stage.

Play-off round

The play-off round was split into two separate sections: Champions Path (for league champions) and League Path (for league non-champions). The losers from both Champions Path and League Path entered the 2019–20 UEFA Europa League group stage. From this stage, the video assistant referee was used.

Group stage

The draw for the group stage was held on 29 August 2019, 18:00 CEST, at the Grimaldi Forum in Monaco. The 32 teams were drawn into eight groups of four, with the restriction that teams from the same association could not be drawn against each other. For the draw, the teams were seeded into four pots based on the following principles:
Pot 1 contained the Champions League and Europa League title holders, and the champions of the top six associations based on their 2018 UEFA country coefficients. If one or both title holders were one of the champions of the top six associations, the champions of the next highest ranked association(s) were also seeded into Pot 1.
Pot 2, 3 and 4 contained the remaining teams, seeded based on their 2019 UEFA club coefficients.

In each group, teams played against each other home-and-away in a round-robin format. The group winners and runners-up advanced to the round of 16, while the third-placed teams entered the 2019–20 UEFA Europa League round of 32. The matchdays were 17–18 September, 1–2 October, 22–23 October, 5–6 November, 26–27 November, and 10–11 December 2019.

The youth teams of the clubs that qualified for the group stage also participated in the 2019–20 UEFA Youth League on the same matchdays, where they competed in the UEFA Champions League Path (the youth domestic champions of the top 32 associations competed in a separate Domestic Champions Path until the play-offs).

A total of sixteen national associations were represented in the group stage. Atalanta made their debut appearance in the group stage.

Group A

Group B

Group C

Group D

Group E

Group F

Group G

Group H

Knockout phase

In the knockout phase, teams played against each other over two legs on a home-and-away basis, except for the one-match final.

Bracket

Round of 16

Quarter-finals

Semi-finals

Final

Statistics
Statistics exclude qualifying rounds and play-off round.

Top goalscorers

Notes

Top assists

Squad of the season
The UEFA technical study group selected the following 23 players as the squad of the tournament.

Notes

Players of the season

Votes were cast for players of the season by coaches of the 32 teams in the group stage, together with 55 journalists selected by the European Sports Media (ESM) group, representing each of UEFA's member associations. The coaches were not allowed to vote for players from their own teams. Jury members selected their top three players, with the first receiving five points, the second three and the third one. The shortlist of the top three players was announced on 16 September 2020. The award winners were announced and presented during the 2020–21 UEFA Champions League group stage draw in Switzerland on 1 October 2020.

Goalkeeper of the season

Defender of the season

Midfielder of the season

Forward of the season

Notes

See also
2019–20 UEFA Europa League
2020 UEFA Super Cup
2019–20 UEFA Women's Champions League
2019–20 UEFA Futsal Champions League
2019–20 UEFA Youth League

Notes

References

External links

 
1
2019-20
Association football events postponed due to the COVID-19 pandemic